Cucullia splendida is a species of moth of the family Noctuidae first described by Caspar Stoll in 1782. It is found in Russia and parts of Africa, Asia and America.

The wingspan is 28–34 mm.

The larvae possibly feed on Artemisia species.

References

External links 
 "09178 Cucullia splendida (Stoll, [1782])". Lepiforum e.V.
 "Species summary for Cucullia splendida". Animalbase. Archived September 23, 2015.
 "Cucullia (Cucullia) splendida (Stoll 1782)". Fauna Europaea. Archived September 24, 2015.
 "Cucullia splendida (Stoll, 1782)". Insecta.pro.

Cucullia
Moths described in 1782